Ichthyosaura randeckensis is a fossil newt species in the family Salamandridae. It was described in 2013 from a Miocene volcanic lake deposit, the Randeck Maar Formation, in Germany. A phylogenetic analysis found the species to be the sister species of the extant alpine newt (Ichthyosaura alpestris), and the authors therefore placed it in the same genus. Later analysis by other authors did not confirm this, however; they suggested I. randeckensis may not belong to Ichthyosaura.

See also
List of prehistoric amphibians

References

Newts
Cenozoic salamanders
Paleogene amphibians of Europe
Fossil taxa described in 2013